Our Lady of the Most Holy Rosary Academy, also known as OLMHRA, is a secondary school in Victoria, Oriental Mindoro, Philippines. 

Schools in Oriental Mindoro